Judah ben Abraham Zarko was a 16th-century Greek Hebrew poet. Born at Rhodes, he lived for a few years at Salonika where he joined the Ḥakme ha-shir literary circle.

During a residence at Constantinople Zarko wrote his maqama Sefer leḥem Yehudah (Constantinople, 1560), which contains an allegory on the soul, metrical and non-metrical poems, and epigrams directed against Maimonides and Judah Sabara. A letter written by him to congratulate Joseph Hamon on his marriage is given at the beginning of the anonymously-compiled Hebrew style-book Sefer yefeh nof, and some of his shorter poems were published by Hirsch Edelmann in his Dibre ḥefetz (London, 1853).

References 

Year of death unknown
Year of birth unknown
People from Rhodes
16th-century Sephardi Jews
16th-century Greek writers
16th-century male writers
Hebrew-language poets
Sephardi Jews from the Ottoman Empire